ConantLeadership is a for-profit organization about leadership services, based in Philadelphia. It was founded in 2011 by Douglas R. Conant, former CEO of Campbell Soup Company. It offers leadership services including leadership blogs, leadership boot camp s, and speaking events.

References 

Companies based in Philadelphia